Igor Rickli Christóforo (born December 14, 1983) is a Brazilian actor.

Biography 
Rickli was born in Ponta Grossa, Paraná. He is of Italian and Swiss descent. He is openly bisexual.

Career 

He started playing theater as a child at the age of six in the church his family attended, and as a teenager he began to produce his own spectacles until at eighteen he decided to become a professional. In the beginning he was taken to live in São Paulo by Ney Alves, current booker of Major Model Brazil to continue his modeling career. On the occasion Igor lived in the house of Ney, in the capital of São Paulo, who saw in the young man a lot of talent for the artistic medium. It was on this occasion that Igor left Ponta Grossa for the first time in search of success in the artistic world.

In 2006, he moved to Rio de Janeiro in search of the dream of becoming an actor and in 2010 he debuts as the protagonist Berger in the HAIR show, the following year he played Mick Deans in Judy Garland, in over the rainbow and Bolivar, in the film Time and the Wind.

In 2013, he makes his television debut in the soap opera Flor do Caribe, as the villain Alberto Albuquerque. In 2014 he was present in Alto Astral in the role of Mohammed. In March 2016, he signed a contract with Rede Record to participate in the novel A Terra Prometida.

Filmography

Personal life
He married in 2010 to singer and actress Aline Wirley, a former member of the Rouge group. Together they have a son, Antônio, born in September 2014.

References

External links

1983 births
Living people
Male actors from Ponta Grossa
Brazilian people of Italian descent
Brazilian people of Swiss-German descent
Brazilian male film actors
Brazilian male telenovela actors
Brazilian male stage actors
Bisexual male actors
Brazilian LGBT actors